

A 

 3192 A'Hearn
 
 
 
 
 
 
 677 Aaltje
 
 
 
 
 
 
 
 
 
 
 
 3277 Aaronson
 
 
 
 
 864 Aase
 2678 Aavasaksa
 8900 AAVSO
 
 
 
 1581 Abanderada
 
 4263 Abashiri
 1390 Abastumani
 
 
 
 
 15262 Abderhalden
 
 
 
 
 
 
 
 
 
 
 
 5677 Aberdonia
 
 
 
 
 
 
 
 
 5175 Ables
 456 Abnoba
 
 
 
 
 3409 Abramov
 
 
 
 6805 Abstracta
 9423 Abt
 
 
 
 
 
 
 
 151 Abundantia
 
 
 
 
 829 Academia
 
 2594 Acamas
 6349 Acapulco
 
 21501 Acevedo
 5126 Achaemenides
 1150 Achaia
 
 5144 Achates
 588 Achilles
 
 9084 Achristou
 
 6522 Aci
 
 
 
 
 
 12238 Actor
 523 Ada
 7803 Adachi
 
 330 Adalberta
 
 
 
 
 
 
 
 
 
 
 
 
 
 
 6537 Adamovich
 
 7655 Adamries
 
 1996 Adams
 
 12838 Adamsmith
 
 
 
 
 
 
 
 
 
 525 Adelaide
 812 Adele
 647 Adelgunde
 276 Adelheid
 
 229 Adelinda
 
 145 Adeona
 
 
 4401 Aditi
 
 
 
 
 398 Admete
 
 
 608 Adolfine
 
 
 2101 Adonis
 268 Adorea
 
 239 Adrastea
 143 Adria
 820 Adriana
 
 32008 Adriángalád
 
 
 
 
 
 
 
 
 
 
 
 
 
 91 Aegina
 96 Aegle
 
 159 Aemilia
 1155 Aënna
 
 396 Aeolia
 
 369 Aëria
 
 
 1027 Aesculapia
 
 446 Aeternitas
 132 Aethra
 1064 Aethusa
 1142 Aetolia
 
 
 
 1187 Afra
 1193 Africa
 
 
 
 
 911 Agamemnon
 5023 Agapenor
 
 
 
 
 
 228 Agathe
 
 
 4722 Agelaos
 
 1873 Agenor
 
 
 
 
 
 47 Aglaja
 641 Agnes
 
 16765 Agnesi
 
 
 847 Agnia
 12848 Agostino
 
 3212 Agricola
 
 645 Agrippina
 
 
 1800 Aguilar
 744 Aguntina
 
 
 
 
 
 
 
 
 
 
 3181 Ahnert
 
 950 Ahrensa
 2826 Ahti
 
 861 Aïda
 
 978 Aidamina
 31192 Aigoual
 1918 Aiguillon
 
 
 
 
 
 
 
 4585 Ainonai
 
 
 17314 Aisakos
 
 
 1568 Aisleen
 
 
 3070 Aitken
 3787 Aivazovskij
 
 
 
 
 
 1404 Ajax
 
 
 
 
 
 
 
 
 
 
 
 
 
 
 
 
 
 
 4949 Akasofu
 
 
 
 
 
 
 
 
 
 3067 Akhmatova
 5101 Akhmerov
 
 
 
 
 
 
 
 
 
 
 
 
 
 
 
 
 
 3872 Akirafujii
 
 
 8187 Akiramisawa
 
 
 
 
 
 
 
 
 2153 Akiyama
 
 
 8034 Akka
 
 4797 Ako
 
 9549 Akplatonov
 
 
 
 2067 Aksnes
 7385 Aktsynovia
 
 
 
 9936 Al-Biruni
 
 
 
 
 
 738 Alagasta
 
 
 
 
 
 24988 Alainmilsztajn
 2927 Alamosa
 
 
 
 
 
 4151 Alanhale
 
 
 
 
 
 
 
 
 
 
 2500 Alascattalo
 
 
 702 Alauda
 
 
 
 
 
 
 719 Albert
 
 
 
 
 
 
 
 
 
 
 
 
 
 
 
 
 
 2697 Albina
 
 
 
 15760 Albion
 
 
 1783 Albitskij
 10656 Albrecht
 
 
 
 
 2241 Alcathous
 
 8549 Alcide
 
 
 3174 Alcock
 22899 Alconrad
 
 
 
 
 
 
 
 
 6470 Aldrin
 14832 Alechinsky
 
 
 
 23436 Alekfursenko
 1909 Alekhin
 
 
 
 
 
 465 Alekto
 418 Alemannia
 
 
 
 
 
 
 5185 Alerossi
 
 
 
 
 
 
 
 259 Aletheia
 
 1194 Aletta
 
 3367 Alex
 
 
 
 
 
 
 
 
 
 
 
 54 Alexandra
 
 
 
 
 
 
 
 
 
 3771 Alexejtolstoj
 
 
 
 
 
 
 
 17119 Alexisrodrz
 
 
 
 9321 Alexkonopliv
 
 
 
 
 14335 Alexosipov
 
 
 
 
 
 
 
 
 1191 Alfaterna
 
 
 
 15258 Alfilipenko
 22577 Alfiuccio
 
 
 
 
 
 
 
 13058 Alfredstevens
 
 1778 Alfvén
 1213 Algeria
 
 
 1394 Algoa
 929 Algunde
 3851 Alhambra
 
 
 
 
 474640 Alicanto
 291 Alice
 
 
 
 
 
 
 
 
 5951 Alicemonet
 
 
 
 
 
 
 
 
 1567 Alikoski
 
 
 58097 Alimov
 
 887 Alinda
 
 266 Aline
 
 
 
 
 
 
 
 7517 Alisondoane
 21558 Alisonliu
 
 
 
 
 
 
 124 Alkeste
 12714 Alkimos
 
 82 Alkmene
 
 3037 Alku
 
 
 
 
 
 
 457 Alleghenia
 
 
 
 
 
 
 
 
 
 
 
 
 
 
 
 
 
 
 
 
 
 
 
 390 Alma
 
 
 
 
 
 
 
 
 
 
 3045 Alois
 
 
 
 
 
 11824 Alpaidze
 
 
 
 925 Alphonsina
 
 
 
 
 
 
 971 Alsatia
 1617 Alschmitt
 
 
 955 Alstede
 12621 Alsufi
 
 7742 Altamira
 8121 Altdorfer
 
 
 
 119 Althaea
 
 
 148780 Altjira
 850 Altona
 
 
 
 
 
 3581 Alvarez
 
 3567 Alvema
 
 
 
 
 1169 Alwine
 
 
 
 7959 Alysecherri
 
 
 
 
 
 
 
 
 
 
 650 Amalasuntha
 
 284 Amalia
 
 113 Amalthea
 725 Amanda
 
 
 
 
 
 
 
 
 
 
 
 
 
 
 
 
 6247 Amanogawa
 
 
 
 
 1085 Amaryllis
 
 
 1035 Amata
 
 
 
 1042 Amazone
 1905 Ambartsumian
 
 
 
 
 
 
 
 193 Ambrosia
 
 
 
 986 Amelia
 
 
 
 
 5010 Amenemhêt
 
 
 916 America
 
 
 516 Amherstia
 
 
 367 Amicitia
 
 
 
 
 
 871 Amneris
 
 
 1221 Amor
 
 
 
 198 Ampella
 
 10247 Amphiaraos
 5244 Amphilochos
 5652 Amphimachus
 37519 Amphios
 29 Amphitrite
 
 
 
 
 3554 Amun
 1065 Amundsenia
 
 
 
 
 
 55576 Amycus
 
 
 
 
 
 
 
 
 
 
 
 
 
 
 
 
 
 
 
 
 
 
 980 Anacostia
 
 11441 Anadiego
 
 3757 Anagolay
 270 Anahita
 
 
 
 
 
 
 
 
 
 
 
 
 
 
 
 824 Anastasia
 
 
 
 
 
 
 
 
 
 
 1173 Anchises
 
 
 
 
 
 
 
 
 
 
 
 
 
 
 
 
 
 
 
 2175 Andrea Doria
 
 
 
 
 
 
 
 
 
 
 
 1296 Andrée
 
 
 
 
 
 
 
 
 6159 Andréseloy
 
 
 
 
 
 
 
 
 
 
 
 
 
 
 
 
 
 
 
 
 
 
 
 
 
 
 
 
 
 
 
 
 
 
 
 
 
 
 
 5027 Androgeos
 175 Andromache
 
 
 
 
 
 
 
 
 
 
 
 
 
 1172 Äneas
 
 
 
 9991 Anežka
 
 
 1957 Angara
 
 
 
 
 
 
 
 
 
 
 
 
 
 
 
 
 
 965 Angelica
 
 64 Angelina
 
 
 
 
 
 
 
 
 1712 Angola
 
 
 
 
 
 
 
 791 Ani
 
 
 
 
 
 
 
 
 
 
 1016 Anitra
 
 
 
 
 
 1457 Ankara
 
 
 
 265 Anna
 
 
 
 
 
 
 
 
 
 
 
 
 
 
 
 
 
 
 
 
 
 
 
 
 
 
 
 
 
 
 
 
 
 
 5535 Annefrank
 
 
 
 
 
 
 
 910 Anneliese
 
 
 
 
 3724 Annenskij
 
 
 2839 Annette
 
 
 
 
 
 
 817 Annika
 
 
 
 
 
 
 
 2572 Annschnell
 
 
 
 
 
 
 
 
 
 
 
 
 
 
 
 
 
 2207 Antenor
 
 1943 Anteros
 
 
 
 
 
 
 
 129 Antigone
 651 Antikleia
 1583 Antilochus
 
 
 1863 Antinous
 90 Antiope
 
 
 
 
 
 
 
 
 
 
 
 272 Antonia
 
 
 
 
 
 
 
 
 
 
 
 
 
 
 
 
 
 1294 Antwerpia
 
 
 1912 Anubis
 
 
 
 
 
 
 
 
 
 2061 Anza
 
 
 
 
 
 
 
 
 
 
 
 
 
 
 
 
 
 
 
 1388 Aphrodite
 19139 Apian
 
 
 132524 APL
 
 1862 Apollo
 
 358 Apollonia
 99942 Apophis
 
 
 988 Appella
 
 1768 Appenzella
 
 
 
 
 
 
 1063 Aquilegia
 
 387 Aquitania
 849 Ara
 
 
 841 Arabella
 1157 Arabia
 1087 Arabis
 407 Arachne
 
 1005 Arago
 
 
 
 
 
 973 Aralia
 
 
 
 
 
 
 
 15810 Arawn
 
 
 
 1020 Arcadia
 
 
 
 
 
 
 
 
 
 5806 Archieroy
 
 
 
 
 
 
 
 1031 Arctica
 
 
 
 
 
 
 394 Arduina
 4337 Arecibo
 
 737 Arequipa
 
 12052 Aretaon
 197 Arete
 
 95 Arethusa
 
 1551 Argelander
 469 Argentina
 
 
 43 Ariadne
 
 
 1225 Ariane
 
 
 
 
 
 
 
 
 
 
 
 
 2135 Aristaeus
 
 
 2934 Aristophanes
 
 793 Arizona
 
 
 
 
 
 
 
 
 
 
 
 
 
 
 
 1717 Arlon
 
 
 10502 Armaghobs
 
 
 
 
 
 780 Armenia
 514 Armida
 
 774 Armor
 6469 Armstrong
 
 
 
 
 959 Arne
 
 
 
 1100 Arnica
 
 
 1018 Arnolda
 
 
 
 
 1304 Arosa
 
 
 
 
 
 
 
 486958 Arrokoth
 
 
 
 404 Arsinoë
 
 
 
 1956 Artek
 
 105 Artemis
 
 
 
 
 18610 Arthurdent
 
 
 
 
 
 
 
 
 
 
 
 
 
 
 
 
 
 
 
 
 
 10121 Arzamas
 
 
 
 
 
 
 
 
 
 
 2023 Asaph
 4756 Asaramas
 
 8405 Asbolus
 
 214 Aschera
 3568 ASCII
 
 4581 Asclepius
 
 
 
 
 
 
 
 
 
 
 
 
 
 
 
 
 
 
 
 
 
 
 
 
 
 
 
 67 Asia
 
 
 
 
 
 
 
 
 4946 Askalaphus
 
 1216 Askania
 962 Aslög
 
 
 
 
 
 
 409 Aspasia
 
 958 Asplinda
 246 Asporina
 
 
 
 
 
 
 1041 Asta
 
 
 672 Astarte
 1218 Aster
 
 658 Asteria
 
 
 4805 Asteropaios
 233 Asterope
 
 5 Astraea
 
 
 1128 Astrid
 
 25000 Astrometria
 100000 Astronautica
 1154 Astronomia
 
 
 
 24626 Astrowizard
 
 
 
 
 
 
 
 152 Atala
 36 Atalante
 1139 Atami
 
 
 
 111 Ate
 2062 Aten
 
 
 515 Athalia
 230 Athamantis
 730 Athanasia
 881 Athene
 
 161 Athor
 
 
 
 163693 Atira
 1827 Atkinson
 1198 Atlantis
 
 810 Atossa
 
 
 273 Atropos
 
 
 
 
 
 
 
 1138 Attica
 
 
 
 
 
 
 
 
 
 
 
 
 
 
 
 
 
 
 13184 Augeias
 254 Augusta
 
 5171 Augustesen
 
 
 
 
 6090 Aulis
 
 
 
 
 
 700 Auravictrix
 
 419 Aurelia
 
 1231 Auricula
 
 94 Aurora
 63 Ausonia
 
 
 
 
 
 
 
 
 136 Austria
 2920 Automedon
 
 
 
 
 
 
 
 
 
 8318 Averroes
 
 
 
 
 
 
 
 
 
 
 
 
 
 
 
 
 
 
 
 
 
 
 
 
 5648 Axius
 
 
 
 
 
 
 594913 ꞌAylóꞌchaxnim
 
 
 
 
 3290 Azabu
 1056 Azalea

See also 
 List of minor planet discoverers
 List of observatory codes

References 
 

Lists of minor planets by name